3040 Kozai, provisional designation , is a stony asteroid and Mars-crosser on a tilted orbit from the innermost regions of the asteroid belt, approximately 4 kilometers in diameters.

The asteroid was discovered by American astronomer William Liller at Cerro Tololo Inter-American Observatory in Chile, on 23 January 1979, and named after Japanese astronomer Yoshihide Kozai. It is considered a classical example of an object submitted to the Kozai effect, induced by an outer perturber, which in this case is the gas giant Jupiter.

Orbit and classification 

Kozai orbits the Sun in the inner main-belt at a distance of 1.5–2.2 AU once every 2 years and 6 months (912 days). Its orbit has an eccentricity of 0.20 and an inclination of 47° with respect to the ecliptic.

Physical characteristics 

In the SMASS classification, Kozai is a common S-type asteroid. As of 2017, little is known about its size, composition, albedo and rotation.

With an absolute magnitude of 13.8, Kozais diameter can be estimated to measure between 4 and 11 kilometers, for an assumed albedo in the range of 0.05–0.25. Since Kozai is a brighter S-type asteroid rather than a darker carbonaceous body, its diameter is on the lower end of NASA's generic conversion table, as the larger the body's diameter, the lower its albedo at a constant absolute magnitude.

Naming 

This minor planet was named in honour of 20th-century Japanese astronomer Yoshihide Kozai, discoverer of the periodic comet D/1977 C1 (Skiff-Kosai) and of the Kozai mechanism. The official naming citation was published by the Minor Planet Center on 2 July 1985.

References

External links 
 Asteroid Lightcurve Database (LCDB), query form (info )
 Dictionary of Minor Planet Names, Google books
 Asteroids and comets rotation curves, CdR – Observatoire de Genève, Raoul Behrend
 Discovery Circumstances: Numbered Minor Planets (1)-(5000) – Minor Planet Center
 
 

 

003040
Discoveries by William Liller
Named minor planets
003040
19790123